La Nymphe surprise, or Surprised Nymph, is a painting by the French impressionist painter Édouard Manet, created in 1861. The model was Suzanne Leenhoff, a pianist whom he married two years later. The painting is a key work in Manet's production, marking the beginning of a new period in his artistic career and generally in the history of modernism in French painting.  It is in National Museum of Fine Arts in Buenos Aires and it is considered one of the collection's highlights.  La Nymphe surprise remained in the artist's possession his entire life, and there is evidence that, apart from the emotional significance it represented for the artist,  Manet considered this painting as one of his most important works.

History
The model of the painting is Édouard Manet's lover, the Dutchwoman Suzanne Leenhoff, with whom he had a secret affair. This affair developed while the young Manet was still living in his parents' house, where Suzanne–who was three years Manet's senior– was engaged as his brothers' piano teacher in 1849.  Their relationship was kept secret from his family. Manet and Suzanne married in 1863, two years after the completion of this painting in 1861. The relationship lasted throughout their lives.

Nymphs were female spirits of nature, female deities from Greek mythology, often depicted as young women, who dwell in mountains and small woods, by springs and rivers. Several authors think that the motif is similar to Rembrandt's Susanna and the Elders, considering that the model's name is Suzanne, she was Dutch and the figure's pose is identical with the one in the painting. In a different point, Françoise Cachin argues that Manet was probably inspired by Jean-Baptiste Santerre's 1704 painting of the same subject, pointing out the position of the arm and the treatment of the material.

Manet kept this painting in his atelier. The painting was exhibited at the Salon des Artistes Français in 1865. This painting was painted two years before the Le Déjeuner sur l'herbe (The Luncheon on the Grass) and Olympia. The painting was purchased by the National Museum of Fine Arts in Buenos Aires and was placed on display at the Museum, as one of the institution's highlights.

Painting
Manet's La Nymphe surprise depicts a young woman sitting in a wooded landscape beside a lake, looking surprised at the viewer. There is a blue iris growing at her feet, and she wears nothing on her body except the white pearls around her neck and a ring on her little finger. The nymph's glance, contrary to Olympia's provocative glance, is surprised and shy, as if she has found the viewer watching her, invading her privacy, disturbing her.

See also
 Boy Carrying a Sword, depicting Manet's and Suzanne's son
 The Reading
 Luncheon in the Studio
 Impressionism
 Nana

References

External links
The ten most popular nymphs in paintings

Portraits by Édouard Manet
Portraits of women
1861 paintings
19th-century portraits
Nude art